Beaurepaire is a surname. Notable people with the surname include:

 Beryl Beaurepaire (1923–2018), Australian activist and politician 
 Frank Beaurepaire (1891–1956), Australian swimmer
 Nicolas-Joseph Beaurepaire (1740–1792), French military officer
 Quesnay de Beaurepaire  (1755–1820), French soldier